Arad is a masculine given name. People with the name include:

 Arad Simon Lakin (1810–1890), American minister, and university president
 Arad McCutchan (1912–1993), American college basketball coach
 Arad Sawat (born 1975), Israeli film and television set and production designer
 Arad Thomas (1807–1889), American lawyer

See also
 Arad (surname), list of people with the surname

Masculine given names